Homme Lake, or Homme Reservoir, is a man-made lake, located west of Park River, North Dakota, that contains walleye, crappie and northern pike. Several species of minnows also live in Homme that include fathead, creek chub, etc.

Homme Lake is named in honor of Mr. H.G. Homme, a prominent real estate investor and business person from Grafton, who was a committed advocate of the project. H.G. Homme is musician Joshua Homme's great grandfather.

The lake was made by the United States Army Corps of Engineers, who still operate some land around it, while the city operates the facilities. The land outside the dam is also accessible for hunting and picnicking.

References

Reservoirs in North Dakota
Bodies of water of Walsh County, North Dakota